is a former professional baseball player from Suita, Osaka, Japan. He played shortstop.

He was chosen as the captain of the Japanese olympic baseball team for the 2004 and 2008 Summer Olympics, and won a bronze medal in 2004. He was also part of the 2006 World Baseball Classic Japanese baseball team.

External links
 

 Career statistics - NPB.jp 

1970 births
Living people
People from Suita
Nippon Professional Baseball infielders
Yakult Swallows players
Tokyo Yakult Swallows players
Baseball players at the 2004 Summer Olympics
Baseball players at the 2008 Summer Olympics
Olympic baseball players of Japan
Olympic bronze medalists for Japan
2006 World Baseball Classic players
Olympic medalists in baseball
Medalists at the 2004 Summer Olympics
Japanese baseball coaches
Nippon Professional Baseball coaches